Samir Shaptahoviç (also known in Albanian as Samir Shaptahu) is a former Kosovo Albanian professional basketball player, who last played for KB Peja. He was born in Bar Tivar in Montenegro in an Albanian family. He is considered one of the best players that the Kosovo Basketball Superleague ever had. He played in Kosovo Basketball Superleague and in Balkan International Basketball League.

He was a member of the Kosovo national basketball team, and former member of the Albanian national basketball team.
He won three times Kosovo Basketball Superleague trophy, first with KB Prishtina in 2001–02, 2002-2003 and second with KB Peja in 2012–13 season. He also played in KK Mornar Bar team and also in Mabetex Prishtina for one season. He is considered a legend of basketball of Kosovo. In the end of 2014–15 season he declared retirement from basketball in Kosovo.

Professional career

2014-15 season
Shaptahoviç played for KB Peja team in Kosovo Basketball Superleague and in Balkan International Basketball League. in 2014–15 season, Shaptahoviç was one of the best of his team. In Kosovo Superleague he averaged with very impressive stats: 20.1 points, 8.1 assists and 4.0 rebounds per game in 27 games played. And in BIBL he averaged with 17.3 points, 5.4 assists and 2.8 rebounds per game in 14 games played.

References

1981 births
Living people
Albanian men's basketball players
Bashkimi Prizren players
KB Peja players
KK Mornar Bar players
Kosovan men's basketball players
Kosovo Albanians
People from Bar, Montenegro
Albanians in Montenegro
Point guards